Pinneberg is a district in Schleswig-Holstein, Germany. It is bounded by (from the northwest and clockwise) the districts of Steinburg and Segeberg, the city (and state) of Hamburg and the state of Lower Saxony (district Stade). The island of Heligoland is also part of the district.

History

The district is roughly identical to the former county of Holstein-Pinneberg. It was established by the Prussian administration in 1867. Since then there has been a continuous loss of territory to the neighbouring cities of Altona (later itself a part of Hamburg), Hamburg and Norderstedt. The island of Heligoland, formerly a district by itself, joined the district in 1932.

Geography

The district is situated on the northern bank of the Elbe River. While Pinneberg is the smallest district within Schleswig-Holstein, it has the most inhabitants. Due to the growing Hamburg metropolitan area the population is still increasing. The district consists mainly of the northwestern suburbs of Hamburg. Although the district of Pinneberg is only connected to the sea through the Elbe, the archipelago of Heligoland became a part of this district in 1932.

Coat of arms
The coat of arms displays a fir tree inside a white nettle-leaf. The leaf is from the arms of the county of Holstein-Schauenburg. The tree symbolises the forestry in the district.

Towns and municipalities

References

External links

 Official website (German)

 
Districts of Schleswig-Holstein